Adelpha syma, the Syma sister, is a species of butterfly of the family Nymphalidae. It is found in South America, including Paraguay, Argentina and Brazil. 

The wingspan is about 50 mm.

Larvae feed on Rubus brasiliensis and Rubus rosifolius.

References

Adelpha
Insects of Central America
Butterflies described in 1824